was a Japanese professional sumo wrestler from Nakanokuchi, Niigata. He was the sport's 36th yokozuna. He was a yokozuna for a period of twelve years and three months dating from his promotion to that rank in May 1941 until his retirement in September 1953, which was an all-time record until surpassed in 2019 by Hakuhō. During his career Haguroyama won seven top division championships and was runner-up on six other occasions. However, he was always in the shadow of yokozuna Futabayama, who came from the same stable. After his retirement he was the head coach of Tatsunami stable until his death in 1969.

Career
Haguroyama made his professional debut in January 1934 at age 19, joining Tatsunami stable. His progression was remarkably rapid. He passed through all the lower divisions in just one tournament each, in every case winning the divisional championship – a feat unlikely ever to be equalled. He made his debut in the top makuuchi division in May 1937. He was promoted to the ōzeki rank after just one tournament at sekiwake. After finishing as runner-up in the January 1941 tournament and winning his first top division title in May 1941 he was promoted to yokozuna. After three more runner-up performances he won his first championship as a yokozuna in May 1944.

Upon the retirement of his great rival Futabayama in November 1945 he became dominant, winning four consecutive tournaments. However, in November 1947 he severed his Achilles tendon and was out of action until May 1949. He won his final championship in January 1952 at age 37 with a perfect 15–0 record. It was his first tournament win in over four years. He retired in September 1953, when he was nearly 39.

He was known for his hard training and his great strength, and was said to be "made of steel."

Retirement from sumo
 Haguroyama married the daughter of his stablemaster, which enabled him to become head coach of Tatsunami stable after retiring from the ring. He produced ōzeki Wakahaguro and several other top wrestlers. When he died in 1969 the title of Tatsunami Oyakata passed onto his son-in-law, former sekiwake Annenyama.

Career Record
Through most of the 1930s and 1940s only two tournaments were held a year, and in 1946 only one was held. The New year tournament began and the Spring tournament returned to Osaka in 1953.

See also
Glossary of sumo terms
List of past sumo wrestlers
List of sumo tournament top division champions
List of yokozuna

References

External links

 Japan Sumo Association profile
 Article on Haguroyama

1914 births
1969 deaths
Japanese sumo wrestlers
People from Niigata (city)
Sumo people from Niigata Prefecture
Yokozuna